Clinton Woods (born 1 May 1972) is a British former professional boxer who competed from 1994 to 2009, and held the IBF light-heavyweight title from 2005 to 2008. At regional level he held the Commonwealth super-middleweight title from 1997 to 1998, the British light-heavyweight title from 1999 to 2000, and the European and Commonwealth light-heavyweight titles from 1999 to 2001.

Early life
Woods was born in Sheffield, England.

Career
Woods started his professional career with a points win over Dave Proctor in his home town of Sheffield. After compiling a record of 13–0 he stepped in with Craig Joseph and beat him over 10 rounds to win the Central Area super middleweight title. After a series of victories, Woods, with a record of 18–0, fought for the vacant Commonwealth belt against Mark Baker, who had a record of 20–1. Woods won the fight and claimed the belt with a 12-round points decision.

In his next fight the unbeaten Woods found himself opposite former British champion David Starie. The fight ended in a first defeat for Woods.

Woods bounced back from the Starie defeat by moving up a weight division to light heavyweight and winning his next two fights before landing a shot at fellow Yorkshireman and current holder of the British, Commonwealth and European light-heavyweight titles Crawford Ashley. Woods knocked out Ashley in the eighth round to capture the three belts.

He ended up defending his Commonwealth and European titles twice each and adding the WBC International light-heavyweight title to his résumé. The latter victory being for a WBC strap, when Woods set himself up for an eliminator for the full WBC light heavyweight title. The fight took place in Sheffield, in September 2001. Woods beat the experienced Italian–Ugandan Yawe Davis in a unanimous decision that would allow him to attempt a world title.

World title fights
Clinton travelled to the United States for his big chance in September 2002. He stepped into the ring at the Rose Garden in Oregon to oppose Roy Jones, with the WBC, WBA, and IBF titles on the line. Woods lost after being stopped in the sixth round and later said that he wasn't really ready for a fight of that magnitude.

Woods rebuilt from the defeat by Jones with three straight wins and then found himself in the ring with Glen Johnson. His second world title attempt was for the IBF belt and took place in November 2003 at Sheffield's Hillsborough Leisure Centre and the fight ended in a draw. Three months later in February 2004 the two met once again in Sheffield this time at the Ponds Forge Centre, the result this time going Johnson's way after 12 rounds.

IBF champion
In his next fight Woods found himself in an IBF title eliminator. Eight months after his defeat to Johnson, Woods took on the Australian Jason DeLisle at the Octagon Centre in Sheffield. He won the fight despite being put down in the first round and set himself up for world title fight number 4. The title was vacant again and this time Woods found himself in the ring with undefeated American Rico Hoye. The fight took place in Rotherham and ended with Woods winning on a technical knockout (T.K.O.) when the referee stopped the fight in the fifth round.

In September 2005 at the Hallam FM Arena, Sheffield, Yorkshire, Woods defeated mandatory challenger  and former WBO and Lineal champion Julio César González via a clear unanimous decision. A successful voluntary defence against DeLisle followed, before Woods fought Jamaican Glen Johnson for a third time. In the ninth round Woods sustained heavy punishment to the head at the hands of Johnson, but fought back to win the subsequent rounds. The American judge, Richard Bays scored the fight 115–112 in favour of Woods, Mickey Vann scored the contest 115–113 in favour of Johnson and Roberto Ramírez 116–112 scored in favour of Woods. It was a split decision but Woods had defeated the man who beat him in 2004.

In September 2007, Woods again successfully defended his IBF title against Julio César González with a unanimous decision.

Defeat and comeback
In April 2008 at St. Pete Times Forum, Tampa, Florida in the United States, Woods gave a lacklustre display against American Antonio Tarver and lost his IBF title. Tarver out-boxed the Sheffield man on the way to a comfortable points victory.  Following the defeat, a dejected Woods hinted that he may quit the sport.  A change of trainer followed, with  Woods replacing Richard Poxon for Glyn Rhodes.  The change seemed to have paid off when on 14 February 2009 Woods travelled to the Channel Island of Jersey to defeat Kosovar-Albanian fighter Elvir Muriqi in an eliminator match for his old IBF title.

Retirement

In August 2009, Woods once more fought on the world stage when he again travelled to Florida, to challenge Tavoris Cloud for the then-vacant IBF title. Woods went on to lose a 12-round decision. When asked about retirement after the defeat, Woods said "To be honest, the thought of that upsets me more than losing the world title, retiring from the sport I love".
However, Woods announced his retirement from boxing on 8 September 2009.

Professional boxing record

References

External links

1972 births
English male boxers
International Boxing Federation champions
Living people
Sportspeople from Sheffield
Commonwealth Boxing Council champions
European Boxing Union champions
World light-heavyweight boxing champions
British Boxing Board of Control champions